The Performers is a Canadian variety television series which aired on CBC Television from 1971 to 1972.

Premise
Episodes were geared towards introducing young and little-known performers. The series was recorded before audiences in various Canadian cities (Edmonton, Halifax, Montreal, Ottawa, Toronto, Vancouver, Winnipeg).

Scheduling
This half-hour series was broadcast on Saturdays at 10:00 p.m. from 22 May to 2 October 1971. Due to a technicians strike in 1972, CBC rebroadcast the series in the same time slot from 22 April to 1 July 1972 then aired episodes on Fridays at 8:00 p.m. from 7 July to 25 August 1972.

References

External links
 

CBC Television original programming
1971 Canadian television series debuts
1972 Canadian television series endings
1970s Canadian variety television series